= Kavalgeri =

Coordinates: 13°18′N 77°24′E

- Village
- Interactive map of Kavalgeri
- Country: India
- State: Karnataka
- District: Dharwad

Government
  - Body: Village Panchayat

Population (2011)
  - Total: 2,137

Languages
  - Official: Kannada
- Time zone: UTC+5:30 (IST)
- ISO 3166 code: IN-KA
- Vehicle registration: KA 25 (Dharwad RTO); KA 63 (Gabbur RTO)
- Website: karnataka.gov.in

Kavalgeri is a village in Dharwad district of Karnataka, India.

== Demographics ==
As of the 2011 census of India there were 450 households in Kavalgeri and a total population of 2,137 consisting of 1,128 males and 1,009 females. There were 284 children ages 0–6.
